Juan Manuel Delgado Lloria (born 17 November 1990), commonly known as Juanma Delgado , is a Spanish professional footballer who plays as a forward for Japanese club V-Varen Nagasaki from 2023.

He spent the vast majority of his career in Spain in the lower leagues, his Segunda División input consisting of ten matches with UCAM Murcia. He competed professionally in Greece (Asteras Tripolis and Kalloni), Scotland (Heart of Midlothian) and Japan (V-Varen Nagasaki, Omiya Ardija and Avispa Fukuoka).

Club career

Early career 
Born in Valencia, Juanma only played lower league football in his country, starting out at FC Jove Español San Vicente in Tercera División. He then moved to Segunda División B, where he represented CD Dénia and Deportivo Alavés. He scored and was sent off – after having already been replaced – in his competitive debut for the latter on 17 October 2012, a 2–1 away win against Huracán Valencia CF in the third round of the Copa del Rey.

Move to Greece 
In the summer of 2013, Juanma joined Greek club Asteras Tripolis FC. He played his first game as a professional on 15 September of that year, featuring six minutes in a 1–1 Super League draw at OFI Crete FC. His first goal came on 12 January 2014, when he contributed to a 3–0 home victory over Platanias FC.

After featuring in 36 games in all competitions and leaving by mutual consent, Juanma spent the 2014–15 season with fellow league side Kalloni FC. He scored his first goal for his new team on 9 November 2014, in a 2–0 away defeat of Panionios FC. He netted twice on 9 February of the following year, helping to a 2–2 home draw against Skoda Xanthi F.C. and an eventual 11th-place finish; subsequently, he signed a new contract.

Hearts 
Juanma signed for Heart of Midlothian on a three-year deal in June 2015, with Kalloni being entitled to 20% of any future transfer.

On 2 August, in his Scottish Premiership debut, he capitalised on a Brad McKay mistake to score the opener at home against St Johnstone, in an eventual 4–3 win. Six days later, in a 2–1 victory at Dundee, he netted twice in five minutes, starting with a penalty. On 19 December, against the same opponent, he received a straight red card in a goalless draw for headbutting David Wotherspoon, and manager Robbie Neilson attributed it to frustration at Scottish referees being more lenient on fouls against strikers than their Spanish counterparts.

Loan to UCAM Murcia 
On 31 August 2016, Juanma was loaned to UCAM Murcia CF for one year, making his professional debut in the Spanish league system on 21 September when he came on as a 35th-minute substitute and scored once in a 4–0 home win over UD Almería in the Segunda División.

Move to Japan 
In January 2017, however, he agreed to a permanent contract with Japanese club V-Varen Nagasaki. He spent the following years in the same country (in both the J2 League and the J1 League), with Omiya Ardija and Avispa Fukuoka.

On 14 December 2022, Juanma returned to former Japanese club V-Varen Nagasaki for the upcoming 2023 season.

Career statistics

Club
.

References

External links

1990 births
Living people
Spanish footballers
Footballers from Valencia (city)
Association football forwards
Segunda División players
Segunda División B players
Tercera División players
CD Dénia footballers
Deportivo Alavés players
UCAM Murcia CF players
Super League Greece players
Asteras Tripolis F.C. players
AEL Kalloni F.C. players
Scottish Professional Football League players
Heart of Midlothian F.C. players
J1 League players
J2 League players
V-Varen Nagasaki players
Omiya Ardija players
Avispa Fukuoka players
Spanish expatriate footballers
Expatriate footballers in Greece
Expatriate footballers in Scotland
Expatriate footballers in Japan
Spanish expatriate sportspeople in Greece
Spanish expatriate sportspeople in Scotland
Spanish expatriate sportspeople in Japan